Sulpizio Costantino (died 1602) was a Roman Catholic prelate who served as Bishop of Nocera de' Pagani (1585–1602).

Biography
On 21 October 1585, Sulpizio Costantino was appointed during the papacy of Pope Sixtus V as Bishop of Nocera de' Pagani.
He served as Bishop of Nocera de' Pagani until his death in 1602.

References

External links and additional sources
 (for Chronology of Bishops) 
 (for Chronology of Bishops) 

16th-century Italian Roman Catholic bishops
17th-century Italian Roman Catholic bishops
Bishops appointed by Pope Sixtus V
1602 deaths